Mahjong Soul is a browser-based online free-to-play tabletop game about riichi mahjong created by Cat Food Studio and Yostar. It was released in June 2018 in China and in April 2019 in Japan and worldwide, also for Android and iOS devices. An anime television series adaptation by Scooter Films titled  aired from April to June 2022 on the Super Animeism block.

Characters

Media

Game
In 2018, Mahjong Soul first launched in China (CN server).  The following year in April, the game platform opened up for English players (EN server).  A service Japanese players (JP server) opened up later in the summer.

Anime
An anime television series adaptation of the game was announced at the live-streamed "Nijisanji Mahjong Cup" tournament on January 9, 2022. The series is animated by Scooter Films, with Kenshirō Morii directing and writing the series, Motoki Nakanishi as assistant director, and Sōshi Kinutani designing the characters. Takatoshi Hamano is directing the sound, and Shintarō Mori is composing the music. It aired from April 2 to June 18, 2022 on the Super Animeism block. Crunchyroll has licensed the series.

References

External links
  
  
 
  
 

2018 video games
Android (operating system) games
Anime television series based on video games
Animeism
Browser-based multiplayer online games
Crunchyroll anime
Free-to-play video games
IOS games
Mahjong in anime and manga
Mahjong video games
Video games developed in China